Alexander Haas (born 11 February 1995)  is an Australian sprint canoeist. At the 2012 Summer Olympics, he competed in the Men's C-2 1000 metres.

References

External links
 
 
 

1995 births
Living people
Australian male canoeists
Olympic canoeists of Australia
Canoeists at the 2012 Summer Olympics
21st-century Australian people